James Henry Escott (17 April 1872 – 28 July 1916) was a Reform Party Member of Parliament in New Zealand.

Escott was born in Orepuki and moved to Woodville when he was 18. He fought in the Boer War.

He won the Pahiatua electorate in 1911, and held it until he died in 1916. He had been planning to join the fight in World War I before his illness and death.

References

1872 births
1916 deaths
Members of the New Zealand House of Representatives
New Zealand military personnel of the Second Boer War
New Zealand MPs for North Island electorates
People from Southland, New Zealand
Reform Party (New Zealand) MPs